Esmaeil Elmkhah (30 December 1936 – 1988) was an Iranian featherweight weightlifter. In 1958 he won a silver medal at the Asian Games and set four unofficial world records: one in the snatch, one in the press and two in the total. He later won a bronze medal at the 1960 Olympics.

Elmkhah was born in Rasht, but grew up in Tehran. He had a sister, and lost his parents when he was a child.

References 

1936 births
1989 deaths
Iranian male weightlifters
Iranian strength athletes
Weightlifters at the 1960 Summer Olympics
Olympic weightlifters of Iran
Olympic bronze medalists for Iran
Asian Games silver medalists for Iran
Olympic medalists in weightlifting
Asian Games medalists in weightlifting
Weightlifters at the 1958 Asian Games
Medalists at the 1960 Summer Olympics
Medalists at the 1958 Asian Games
People from Rasht
Sportspeople from Gilan province
20th-century Iranian people